The White Stork Synagogue is a nineteenth-century synagogue in Wrocław, Poland. Rededicated in 2010 after a decade-long renovation, it is the religious and cultural centre of the local Jewish community, under the auspices of the Union of Jewish Religious Communities in Poland. It is the only synagogue in Wrocław to have survived the Holocaust.

History
The synagogue, which opened in 1829 when the city was known as Breslau and part of the Kingdom of Prussia, is a three-story Neoclassical  designed by the architect Carl Ferdinand Langhans (1781–1869). Langhans was one of the foremost 19th-century architects of Silesia. He was among Germany's foremost theater designers. He also designed the Breslau Actors' Guild Theater and Opera House. The original interior, now lost, was designed by the painter Raphael Biow (1771–1836) and his son Hermann Biow (1804–1850). The name was taken from an inn of the same name which had previously stood on the site.

The  main prayer hall is surrounded on three sides with women's galleries. Two levels of galleries to the north and two on the south flank a single gallery on the eastern Torah ark  wall. The wooden frame of the Torah ark and the damaged tablets of the Ten Commandments are all that remain of the original religious features.

During the Kristallnacht the interior of the building was destroyed by the Sturmabteilung who also tore up the Torah scrolls. On the same night, the New Synagogue, which served the city's Liberal community was burned to the ground by the Nazi paramilitary groups. The White Stork synagogue, which at the time served Conservative Jews escaped that fate, because it was located close to other buildings and the participants in the pogrom were concerned that any fire would spread to non-Jewish structures.

The synagogue was renovated by the city's Jewish community and became a place of worship for Jews of all sects until 1943. In that year, the Nazis took over the building and turned it into a warehouse for stolen Jewish property. The city's Jewish inhabitants were rounded up and sent to death camps, with the synagogue's courtyard serving as a collection point, in the same way as Umschlagplatz in Warsaw.

After the war, the city's Polish authorities turned over the building to the new Jewish community in the city. It functioned as both a community center and a place of worship, despite underfunding, the emigration of Wroclaw's Jews abroad, and repeated vandalism by so-called "unknown perpetrators" ("nieznani sprawcy" a Communist era Polish code word for individuals committing crimes on behalf of the secret communist police). After the 1968 Polish political crisis, which saw a Communist-sponsored anti-Semitic campaign, most of the city's Jews left Poland and shortly thereafter, religious ceremonies in the synagogue were suspended.

The synagogue was in use until 1974, when the authorities expropriated it and gave it to the University of Wrocław, which used it as a library. In 1989, the university transferred the building to the Musical Academy. It was purchased by a private firm in 1995. It was subsequently returned to the Jewish community and was under renovation for over a decade.   The renovations were completed and the synagogue rededicated in 2010. There are plans for the synagogue to be used as a Jewish Museum.

On October 11, 2012, during the local gay rights parade, a small window of the synagogue was broken with a stone thrown by an unidentified vandal believed to have belonged to an anti-gay sympathizers of the right-wing Polish popular revival protesting on the sidelines. Police analyzed the video, but no arrest was made. The incident was assessed by authorities as simple act of vandalism.

In 2014, it celebrated its first ordination of four Reform rabbis and three Reform cantors since the Second World War. The German Foreign Minister attended the ceremony.

See also
 Four Denominations District

References

External links
Photo galleries of the synagogue and recent restoration

21st-century attacks on synagogues and Jewish communal organizations
Ashkenazi Jewish culture in Poland
Ashkenazi synagogues
Conservative Judaism in Europe
Conservative synagogues
Former synagogues in Poland
History museums in Poland
Holocaust locations in Poland
Jewish museums in Poland
Reform synagogues in Poland
Synagogues completed in 1829
Museums in Wrocław
Neoclassical architecture in Poland
Neoclassical synagogues
Synagogues in Wrocław
Synagogues preserved as museums
19th-century religious buildings and structures in Poland